Claudio Costa may refer to:

 Claudio R. M. Costa (born 1949), general authority of The Church of Jesus Christ of Latter-day Saints
 Claudio Costa (doctor) (born 1941), Italian medical doctor, founder of the Mobile Clinic
 Claudio Costa (artist) (1942–1995), Italian artist
 Claudio Costa (parathlete) (born 1963), Italian Paralympic multi-sport athlete